Warped! is an American buddy comedy television series created by Kevin Kopelow and Heath Seifert that aired on Nickelodeon from January 16 to March 31, 2022. The series stars Kate Godfrey, Anton Starkman, Ariana Molkara, and Christopher Martinez.

Premise 
Warped! follows Milo, the beloved head geek and manager at a popular comic book store, Warped!, whose microcosm is disrupted when his boss hires the loud and excitable, Ruby.

Cast

Main 
 Kate Godfrey as Ruby, an eccentric and impulsive teen girl who starts working at the comic book store Warped! after moving to the city. Besides being an expert in comics like Milo, she is a good artist and helps him with his graphic novel by designing the characters.
 Anton Starkman as Milo, the manager of the comic book store Warped!, and a comic book expert. He often acts as the most responsible for the complicated situations that he and his friends experience. He dreams of writing a graphic novel.
 Ariana Molkara as Darby, a friend of Milo and Ruby, who likes to dress up as different fictional characters.
 Christopher Martinez as Hurley, a friend of Milo and Ruby, who works at the pizzeria above the comic book store in the mall, though he often neglects his job.

Recurring 
 Makenzie Lee-Foster as Ren, a little girl who is often at the comic book store reading comics for a more mature audience.
 Milan Carter as Wilson, the owner of Warped!, and Milo and Ruby's boss.

Production 
On October 23, 2020, it was announced that Nickelodeon ordered a pilot for Warped! a comic bookstore comedy television series created by Kevin Kopelow and Heath Seifert. Kevin Kopelow, Heath Seifert, and Kevin Kay serve as executive producers. On March 18, 2021, it was announced that Nickelodeon officially green-lit Warped! as a buddy comedy television series. The series' cast includes Kate Godfrey as Ruby, Anton Starkman as Milo, Ariana Molkara as Darby, and Christopher Martinez as Hurley. The pilot episode was directed by Jonathan Judge. On December 20, 2021, it was announced that the series would premiere on January 20, 2022; however, the series began airing on January 16, 2022, branded as a sneak peek. The series ended after its only season on March 31 of that same year.

Episodes

Ratings 
 
}}

References

External links 
 
 

2020s American children's comedy television series
2020s Nickelodeon original programming
2022 American television series debuts
2022 American television series endings
English-language television shows